Arik Ben Marshall  (born February 13, 1967) is an American guitarist, singer, songwriter, poet, and author, best known as a member of the Red Hot Chili Peppers in 1992-93.

Early life
Arik Ben Marshall is the third of five children born to an African-American father and a Jewish mother.  He grew up and attended school in South Central Los Angeles, graduating from Mid City Alternative Magnet School.

In the 8th grade, Marshall broke his leg during a football game he was playing with friends and spent the better part of the year being homeschooled while he recuperated, first at Children's Hospital of Los Angeles, and later at home where he spent several months in a full body cast.  Marshall later credited this period in his life for preparing him for musical study, as the forced inactivity calmed down his naturally hyperactive personality thus giving him the focus and patience he would need in order to develop as a musician.

Marshall began playing guitar in his teens, counting as musical influences P-Funk (Parliament Funkadelic), Jimi Hendrix, Stevie Ray Vaughan, Brian Setzer of the Stray Cats, Prince, Django Reinhardt, Steven Hufsteter, Matthew Ashman from Bow Wow Wow, the Clash, Michael Jackson, the Talking Heads, Björk, and the Isley Brothers, among many others.

After high school, Marshall worked briefly as a messenger for downtown Los Angeles law firms.  He has also taught guitar at Los Angeles City College and The Musician's Institute.

Musical beginnings
After performing around Los Angeles with a variety of musicians, Marshall began getting work as a session musician, appearing on recordings for artists such as Tone Loc, Etta James, and Sting.  In 1988, he and his brother Lonnie Marshall formed a band they called Marshall Law. They signed a development deal with Island Records and recorded a demo for them. The band broke up having only released two tracks on a Ska Parade compilation. After the breakup, Lonnie formed Weapon of Choice.  Marshall continued to perform locally in Los Angeles and briefly led his own band, Alpha Jerk, before disbanding it to join the Red Hot Chili Peppers in 1992. Marshall Law reunited in 2006 and released an album, another X-cuse.

Red Hot Chili Peppers
Marshall joined the Red Hot Chili Peppers in 1992 to replace lead guitarist John Frusciante, who quit in the middle of the band's worldwide Blood Sugar Sex Magik Tour. He toured extensively with the band during his tenure as their guitarist and played the Lollapalooza festival of that year. Singer Anthony Kiedis later praised Marshall for being "a quick study" and never letting them down onstage. Despite not playing on the recorded songs, Marshall appeared in music videos for the songs "Breaking the Girl" and "If You Have to Ask". Marshall and the other Red Hot Chili Peppers performed as themselves in "Krusty Gets Kancelled", a 1993 episode of The Simpsons. 

Marshall's last concert performance with the Red Hot Chili Peppers was the February 9, 1993, but they appeared at the 1993 Grammy Awards ceremony on February 24 to perform "Give It Away." Chili Peppers drummer Chad Smith would described Marshall as "a great guy and an amazing guitar player," yet when it came time to write new songs Marshall turned out to not be a good fit for the band. For this reason, Marshall was released from the band and was replaced by Jesse Tobias, who was soon replaced by Dave Navarro.

On April 14, 2012, the Chili Peppers were inducted into the Rock and Roll Hall of Fame. Since Marshall did not perform on any studio recordings with the band, he was not inducted as a member; however, drummer Smith thanked Marshall along with other former members for their contributions to the band.

Post-Red Hot Chili Peppers musical career
After his departure from the Red Hot Chili Peppers, Marshall joined Macy Gray's band, playing guitar on her releases:  On How Life Is (1999), The Id (2001) and The Trouble With Being Myself (2003).  As a member of Gray's band, Marshall toured extensively, internationally and in the United States.  In 2010, he performed with her at a benefit concert for Haiti.

Marshall contributed to three Weapon of Choice releases:  Highperspice (1996), Illoominutty (2002) and Color Me Funky (2004), and appeared on the recordings of Moloko and Poe.  He co-wrote a song which was recorded by Rod Stewart in 2003.  Other artists he has recorded or performed with include:  Chaka Khan, The Prodigy, George Clinton and Parliament Funkadelic, Ice Cube, Björk, Jodeci, Lisa Marie Presley, Soundgarden, Pearl Jam, the Circle Jerks and Carlos Santana.

Marshall continued to perform on his own and to work on solo projects, independently producing and releasing four albums:  Memories of Amnesia (2001), Fantaseality (2003), Pleasures of the Funky (2005) and Heaven's Ghetto (2009).

He self-published a book of poetry in 2008, titled B.A.D. Words:  the alphabet music of Ah'Reek Marshall.  In 2011, he released a children's book, Bumble-Bee Yourself, a collaboration with illustrator Mimi Kang.

In 2011 Arik released a music video for "True To The Almighty" a single from his Memories of Amnesia cd.  He is currently working on a music video for "Heaven's Ghetto" single, When the Sound Starts Moving.

Film and television appearances
Marshall appeared on Saturday Night Live and The Rosie O'Donnell Show with Macy Gray.  He performed at the 1992 MTV Video Music Awards and the 1993 Grammy Awards shows with the Red Hot Chili Peppers.

He appeared on the Simpsons episode "Krusty Gets Kancelled" as part of the Red Hot Chili Peppers' cameo appearance.

He appeared in 2002's Spider-Man movie in a cameo appearance with Macy Gray.

He acted in and wrote the soundtrack to an Academy Award-winning USC student film, Peace & Quiet.  In an interview in 2007, Marshall said of the film, "I played a mulatto punk-rocker who destroys this old guys suburban home...right in front of him! I wore a Mohawk and a Funkadelic t-shirt..."

Marshall appeared as the guitarist in the wedding scene of the 2009 movie The Hangover.

References

1967 births
African-American rock musicians
African-American rock singers
African-American Jews
Jewish American musicians
American rock guitarists
American male guitarists
Red Hot Chili Peppers members
Living people
20th-century American guitarists
African-American guitarists